The municipal flag of Cleveland serves as the representative banner of the city of Cleveland, Ohio, United States.  It consists of three vertical stripes, of equal width, in red, white and blue respectively.  The center white stripe bears the American shield with the word "Cleveland" across its center, and the year 1796 in red, at its base, surrounded by a laurel wreath. The outline of the lower half of the shield is in red and of the upper in blue. In the upper left-hand corner of the shield are an anvil, hammer and wheel, and in the upper right-hand corner an anchor, windlass and oars. Under the shield is the city's motto, "Progress and Prosperity."

The flag's creation
The Cleveland flag was designed in 1895 by Susan Hepburn, a Cleveland high school student.  Repetitions against the flag stalled its establishment, but by October 21, it was approved by Cleveland City Council. On February 21, 1896, the year in which celebrated its centennial, an ordinance was put in place on the banner. Mayor Robert E. McKisson approved it on February 26. The city's motto of "Progress and Prosperity" was not added until the 1960s.

Symbolism
Both the colors and the use of the American shield represent patriotism, something that many felt would unite the city.  1796 is the year in which Cleveland was founded by Gen. Moses Cleaveland.  The anvil, hammer and wheel represent the city's heavy industry.  The anchor, windlass and oars represent maritime interests (Cleveland is a major port on the Great Lakes).  The city's motto, "Progress and Prosperity" refers to the substantial boom period Cleveland experienced through the first half of the 20th century.

References
 A History Of Cleveland And Its Environs: The Heart Of New Connecticut by Elroy McKendree Avery

External links
 Municipal Code of Cleveland (sections pertaining to Municipal Flag)

Cleveland
Cleveland
Cleaveland
1896 establishments in Ohio